HGSS may refer to:

Holmer Green Senior School, a secondary school in Buckinghamshire, England
Hougang Secondary School, a secondary school in Hougang, Singapore
HG/SS, shorthand for Pokémon HeartGold and SoulSilver game versions